Sabaton is a knight's foot armour.

Sabaton may also refer to:

Sabaton (band), Swedish heavy metal band
Sabaton, El Salvador TV program with Maria Luisa Vicuña